"Perfect Gentleman" is a song and single by German power metal band Helloween, taken from the album Master of the Rings.

Single track listing

Personnel
Andi Deris - vocals
Roland Grapow - lead and rhythm guitars
Michael Weikath - lead and rhythm guitars
Markus Grosskopf - bass
Uli Kusch - drums

References

1994 singles
Helloween songs
Songs written by Andi Deris